Ammonium permanganate is the chemical compound NH4MnO4, or NH3·HMnO4. It is a water soluble, violet-brown or dark purple salt.

Preparation 
Ammonium permanganate was first prepared by Eilhard Mitscherlich in 1824 by reaction of silver permanganate with equal molar amount of ammonium chloride, filtering the silver chloride and evaporating the water. 

AgMnO4 + NH4Cl → AgCl + NH4MnO4
It can also be prepared in a similar way from barium permanganate and ammonium sulfate.

Ba(MnO4)2 + (NH4)2SO4 → BaSO4 + 2 NH4MnO4

Properties 
Ammonium permanganate is a strong oxidizer, owing to its permanganate anion, and it is a moderately strong explosive, owing to the combination of oxidizer permanganate anion and reducing ammonium cation. Dry ammonium permanganate can detonate by heat, shock, or friction, and it may explode at temperatures above 140 °F (60 °C).

Ammonium permanganate decomposes explosively to manganese dioxide, nitrogen, and water:
2 NH4MnO4 → 2 MnO2 + N2 + 4 H2O

Ammonium permanganate decomposes slowly in storage even at normal temperatures. A sample stored for 3 months was only 96% pure, after 6 months it assumed color of iodine and had strong smell of nitrogen oxides. It emits toxic fumes when decomposed by heat.

Quaternary ammonium permanganate compounds can be prepared, such as tetrabutylammonium permanganate and benzyltriethylammonium permanganate.

References

Ammonium compounds
Permanganates
Oxidizing agents
Pyrotechnic oxidizers
Explosive chemicals